Carabus obsoletus nagyagensis is a subspecies of ground beetle in the subfamily Carabinae that is endemic to Romania. The species are either brown or dark blue coloured.

References

obsoletus nagyagensis
Beetles described in 1888
Endemic fauna of Romania